Américo Villarreal Anaya (b. 23 May 1958) is a Mexican cardiologist and politician affiliated with the National Regeneration Movement and the current Governor of Tamaulipas. He previously served as a senator for the state.

References

1958 births
Living people
20th-century Mexican politicians
21st-century Mexican politicians
Governors of Tamaulipas
Institutional Revolutionary Party politicians
Members of the Chamber of Deputies (Mexico)
Mexican cardiologists
Morena (political party) politicians
Politicians from Tamaulipas
Senators of the LXIV and LXV Legislatures of Mexico